The 2015–16 Bulgarian Cup was the 34th official edition of the Bulgarian annual football knockout tournament. The competition began on 23 September 2015 with the matches of the First Round and finished with the final on 24 May 2016. Cherno More Varna were the defending champions.

For the first time in the history of this competition the winner, CSKA Sofia, came from the third division of Bulgarian football. However as the club was excluded from participating in the 2016–17 European competitions by the UEFA Club Financial Control Body., its place was taken up by the runners-up of the 2015–16 A Group, Levski Sofia, who is entitled to participate in the second qualifying round of the 2016–17 UEFA Europa League.

Participating clubs 
The following teams competed in the cup:
(Teams still active are in bold)

First round 
The draw was conducted on 11 September 2015. The games were played between 22 and 24 September 2015. On this stage all of the participants started their participation i.e. the 10 teams from A PFG (first division), the 14 teams from the B PFG (second division) and the 8 winners from the regional amateur competitions.

Second round 
The draw was conducted on 30 September 2015. The games will be played between 27 and 29 October 2015. On this stage the participants will be the 16 winners from the first round.

Quarter-finals 
The draw was conducted on 3 November 2015. The games will be played between 8 and 10 December 2015. On this stage the participants will be the 8 winners from the second round.

Semi-finals 
The draw was to be conducted on 15 December 2015. The draw was postponed because of the expulsion of Litex Lovech from the A PFG after the team was ordered off the pitch in a controversial league match against Levski Sofia. At the time it was not clear how this would affect Litex's continued participation in this edition of the Bulgarian Cup. A new date for the draw was scheduled for the 16th of February 2016. The first legs were  played on 6 April and the second legs were played on 20 and 21 April 2016.

First legs

Second legs

Final

Statistics

Top scorers

Hat-tricks

See also 
 2015–16 A Group
 2015–16 B Group
 2015–16 V AFG

References 

Bulgarian Cup seasons
Bulgarian Cup
Cup